NGC 7190 is a barred lenticular galaxy registered in the New General Catalogue. It is located in the direction of the Pegasus constellation. It was discovered by the French astronomer Édouard Stephan in 1870 using an 80.01 cm (31.5 inch) reflector.

See also 
 New General Catalogue

References

External links 

Lenticular galaxies
Pegasus (constellation)
7190
11885
67928
Astronomical objects discovered in 1870